Zdravčići is a village in the municipality of Požega, western Serbia. According to the 2002 census, the village has a population of 526 people.

Some of the most notable people in Zravčići are:

Đuro Relić

References

Populated places in Zlatibor District